Straubing Wallmühle Airport  is a minor German regional airport, located about 3 miles north-northwest of Straubing in Bavaria. It is used for general aviation.

History
Today's Straubing airfield was founded at the beginning of the 1960s by some flight enthusiasts from Straubing. At first only gliding operations with winch towing took place. In 1972, Straubing-Wallmühle airfield was founded as a limited liability company by the two shareholders, the city of Straubing and the district of Straubing-Bogen. 
Since that time, the airport has been a public transport company (Verkehrslandeplatz) with a daily duty to operate at binding opening times.

Airlines and destinations
As of April 2016, there are no scheduled services to or from Straubing. Briefly during early 2016 Danish charter airline Flexflight offered services between Straubing and Salzburg Airport. Flights were later moved from Straubing to Augsburg Airport.

References

External links

 Airport official website

Straubing
Straubing
Training establishments of the Luftwaffe